A wireless Internet service provider (WISP) is an Internet service provider with a network based on wireless networking. Technology may include commonplace Wi-Fi wireless mesh networking, or proprietary equipment designed to operate over open 900 MHz, 2.4 GHz, 4.9, 5, 24, and 60 GHz bands or licensed frequencies in the UHF band (including the MMDS frequency band), LMDS, and other bands from 6 GHz to 80 GHz.

In the US, the Federal Communications Commission (FCC) released Report and Order, FCC 05-56 in 2005 that revised the FCC’s rules to open the 3650 MHz band for terrestrial wireless broadband operations. On November 14, 2007 the Commission released Public Notice (DA 07-4605) in which the Wireless Telecommunications Bureau announced the start date for licensing and registration process for the 3650-3700 MHz band.

As of July 2015, there are over 2,000 fixed wireless broadband providers operating in the US, servicing nearly 4 million customers.

History
Initially, WISPs were only found in rural areas not covered by cable television or DSL. The first WISP in the world was LARIAT, a non-profit rural telecommunications cooperative founded in 1992 in Laramie, Wyoming by electrical engineer and InfoWorld columnist Brett Glass. LARIAT originally used WaveLAN equipment, manufactured by the NCR Corporation, which operated on the 900 MHz unlicensed radio band. LARIAT was taken private in 2003 and continues to exist as a for-profit wireless ISP.

Another early WISP was a company called Internet Office Parks in Johannesburg, South Africa that was founded by Roy Pater, Brett Airey and Attila Barath in January 1996 when they realized the South African Telco, Telkom could not keep up with the demand for dedicated Internet links for business use. Using what was one of the first wireless LAN products available for wireless barcode scanning in stores, called Aironet (now owned by Cisco), they worked out if they ran a dedicated Telco link into the highest building in a business area or CBD they could wirelessly "cable" up all the other buildings back to this main point and would only require one link from the Telco to connect up hundreds of businesses at the same time.  In turn each "satellite" building was wired up with Ethernet so each business connected into the Ethernet LAN could instantly get Internet access.  Due to the immaturity of wireless technology, security issues and being forced constantly by Telkom SA (Then the government Telco in South Africa) to cease its service, the company closed its doors in Jan 1999.

There were 879 Wi-Fi based WISPs in the Czech Republic as of May 2008, making it the country with most Wi-Fi access points in the whole EU. The providing of wireless Internet has a big potential of lowering the "digital gap" or "Internet gap" in the developing countries. Geekcorps actively help in Africa with among others wireless network building. An example of a typical WISP system is such as the one deployed by Gaiacom Wireless Networks which is based on Wi-Fi standards.  The One Laptop per Child project strongly relies on good Internet connectivity, which can most likely be provided in rural areas only with satellite or wireless network Internet access. In high internet cost countries such as South Africa, prices have been drastically reduced by the government allocating spectrum to smaller WISPs, who are able to deliver high speed broadband at a much lower cost.

Some WISP networks have been started in rural parts of the United Kingdom, to address issues with poor broadband DSL service (bandwidth) in rural areas ("notspots"), including slow rollout of fibre based services which could improve service (usually Fibre to the cabinet to groups of rural buildings, potentially Fibre to the premises for isolated buildings).  A number of these WISPs have been set up via the Community Broadband Network, using funds from the European Agricultural Fund for Rural Development

Overview
WISPs often offer additional services like location-based content, Virtual Private Networking (VPN) and Voice over IP.  Isolated municipal ISPs and larger statewide initiatives alike are tightly focused on wireless networking.

WISPs have a large market share in rural environments where cable and digital subscriber lines are not available; further, with technology available, they can meet or beat speeds of legacy cable and telephone systems.  In urban environments, gigabit wireless links are common and provide levels of bandwidth previously only available through expensive fiber optic connections.

Typically, the way that a WISP operates is to order a fiber circuit to the center of the area they wish to serve.  From there, the WISP will start building backhauls (gigabit wireless or fiber) to elevated points in the region, such as radio towers, tall buildings, grain silos, or water towers.  Those locations will have access points to provide service to individual customers or backhauls to other towers where they have more equipment. The WISP may also use gigabit wireless links to connect a PoP (Point of Presence) to several towers, reducing the need to pay for fiber circuits to the tower.  For fixed wireless connections, a small dish or antenna is mounted to the roof of the customer's building and aligned to the WISP's nearest antenna site. When operating over the tightly limited range of the heavily populated 2.4 GHz band, as nearly all 802.11-based Wi‑Fi providers do, it is not uncommon to also see access points mounted on light posts and customer buildings.

Since it is difficult for a single service provider to build an infrastructure that offers global access to its subscribers, roaming between service providers is encouraged by the Wi-Fi Alliance with the protocol WISPr, a set of recommendations approved by the alliance which facilitate inter-network and inter-operator roaming of Wi-Fi users.  Modern wireless services have latency comparable to other terrestrial broadband networks.

Technology problems
 Line-of-sight and non-line-of-sight propagation

See also
 Airspan Networks
 ConnectKentucky
 Geekcorps
 
 Microwave Bypass
 Motorola Canopy
 Neighborhood Internet service provider (NISP)
 Radwin
 Satellite Internet access
 Starry Internet
 Telrad Networks
 TP-LINK
 Ubiquiti Networks
 Wireless local loop

References

External links

 WISPA - a trade association for WISP owner/operators

Wireless networking